Georgetown Park is a mixed use shopping mall and condominium complex in the Georgetown historic district of Washington, D.C. The Shops at Georgetown Park are located at 3222 M Street, NW. In 2014, the complex received an $80 million renovation and is an important tourist attraction.

History
The first phase of the complex opened in 1981. Parts of the structure predate 1838 when it was used as a tobacco warehouse that opened up directly onto the Chesapeake and Ohio Canal. In the 1850s, the building was purchased by John E. Reeside and Gilbert Vanderwerken and converted into stables for their omnibus line. The building continued to be used as stables for the first horsecar line, the Washington and Georgetown Railroad. It was later converted into a machine shop for streetcars. The parts of the building that face the canal and the facade of the M Street entrance remain from those earlier periods. After the demise of Washington's streetcars in 1962, the building served as the United States Defense Communications Annex E before being converted to its current use.

Shopping center
In 1975, Donohoe Construction Co., in partnership with Western Development Corp., acquired the historic site to develop as a combined shopping and housing complex, The Shops at Georgetown Park. One engineering magazine called it the most complicated construction job on the East Coast. Upscale features of the building included wood-floored hallways, a block-long skylight with cast-iron braces, brass and glass elevators, and hand-built oak kiosks. Construction costs came to $50 million for the retail center, $25 million for the condominiums, and $20 million for store interiors and fixtures.

The Canal House opened as the first phase of the project in 1980, with a Conran's homegoods store topped by 35 condominiums. At opening of the second phase on September 27, 1981, the "shopping park" had 100 stores and 128 condominiums. Original stores included the first East Coast branch of Abercrombie & Fitch, a 16,000-square-foot branch of Garfinckel's, Ann Taylor, and Scan Furniture. Among the stores opening Washington branches were Davisons of Bermuda, a women's high-fashion shop from Miami; La Vogue, a Richmond-based women's wear store; Le Sac, a New Orleans-based boutique; Senor David, a New York retailer of Italian menswear; a Linea Pitti tailor shop; Mark Cross, the leather goods store; and Godiva Chocolatier. The shopping park was deliberately designed not to have a major anchor store.

In 1998, Western sold the property to a company controlled by AEW Capital Management but retained a “right of first offer” to repurchase the mall. Anthony Lanier of EastBanc, Inc., another developer, claims Miller sold that right to EastBanc in 1998 in exchange for a 7.5 percent stake in the mall. Miller claimed the right had expired in May 2002. EastBanc sued Western in 2006, and Western moved to repurchase the property on its own in 2007, suing EastBanc and Lanier personally for malicious filing.

On September 10, 2008, Bloomingdale's announced plans to open a three-level,  anchor store at The Shops by August 2011. The store was to be modeled after the chain's concept store in New York's SoHo neighborhood to carry select contemporary men's and women's apparel. With this announcement, Western believed Georgetown Park would become "the highest fashion and trend center in the whole Washington area"; however, the deal fell through in the summer of 2009 due to the ongoing legal dispute with EastBanc. In the autumn of that year, Western defaulted on a loan worth at least $70 million, and the property went into foreclosure. The vacancy rate had risen to 56 percent by April 2010.

In 2010, the property was purchased out of foreclosure by Vornado Realty Trust and investment firm Angelo, Gordon & Co. The new owners embarked on a major renovation for a grand re-opening in the spring of 2013, adding discount retailers including DSW and T.J. Maxx. In 2013, H&M opened in the center, and was the first location in the U.S. to sell home goods.

Jamestown purchased the center in 2014 and was renovated at a cost of $80 million. The name has since been simplified to Georgetown Park. A Washington Sports Club closed in 2020. Forever 21 opened in 2016 but closed in 2020. As of 2023 tenants include T.J. Maxx, Anthropologie, H&M, J. Crew, Pinstripes Bowling Alley, and a DC DMV service center.

References

External links
 The Shops at Georgetown Park
 Georgetown Park Condominiums

Shopping malls in Washington, D.C.
Georgetown (Washington, D.C.)
Shopping malls established in 1981
1981 establishments in Washington, D.C.